A Commonwealth citizen is a citizen or qualified national of a Commonwealth of Nations member state. Most member countries do not treat citizens of other Commonwealth states any differently from foreign nationals, but some grant limited citizenship rights to resident Commonwealth citizens. In 16 member states, resident non-local Commonwealth citizens are eligible to vote in elections. The status is most significant in the United Kingdom, and carries few or no privileges in many other Commonwealth countries.

Background 

Commonwealth citizenship was created out of a gradual transition from an earlier form of British nationality. Before 1949, all citizens of the British Empire were British subjects and owed allegiance to the Crown. Although the Dominions (Australia, Canada, Ireland, Newfoundland, New Zealand, and South Africa) created their own nationality laws following the First World War, they mutually maintained British subjecthood as a common nationality with the United Kingdom and its colonies. However, divergence in Dominion legislation and growing assertions of independence from London culminated in the creation of Canadian citizenship in 1946 and its separation from British subject status. Combined with the impending independence of India and Pakistan in 1947, nationality law reform became necessary.

The British Nationality Act 1948 redefined British subject as any citizen of the United Kingdom, its colonies, or other Commonwealth countries. Commonwealth citizen was also defined in this Act as having the same meaning. This change in naming indicated a shift in the base theory of British nationality, that allegiance to the Crown was no longer a requirement to hold British subject status. The change was also necessary to retain a number of newly independent countries that wished to become republics rather than retain the monarch as head of state. The common status of Commonwealth citizenship would instead be maintained voluntarily by the various members of the Commonwealth.

At first, all Commonwealth citizens held the automatic right to settle in the United Kingdom. This was first restricted by Parliament with the Commonwealth Immigrants Act 1962, which imposed immigration controls on subjects originating from outside the British Islands. The Immigration Act 1971 relaxed controls on patrials, those whose parents or grandparents were born in the United Kingdom, and effectively gave preferential treatment to Commonwealth citizens from white-majority countries.

Outside the United Kingdom, in some member states Commonwealth citizens also initially retained eligibility to vote in elections, to preferred paths to citizenship, and to welfare benefits. These privileges were removed on independence in most countries but retained in some. British subjects/Commonwealth citizens were eligible to vote in New Zealand until 1975, Canada at the federal level until 1975 (not fully phased out in provinces until 2006), and Australia until 1984 (though subjects on the electoral roll in that year are still eligible).

By the 1980s, most colonies of the British Empire had become independent. Parliament updated nationality law to reflect the more modest geographical boundaries of the United Kingdom and its remaining territories. The British Nationality Act 1981 redefined British subject in such a way that it no longer also meant Commonwealth citizen.

Acquisition and loss 

Commonwealth citizenship is acquired by virtue of being a citizen of a Commonwealth member state or, in the United Kingdom, a country listed in Schedule 3 of the British Nationality Act 1981. This list closely follows the composition of the organisation, but is not always the same. For example, the Maldives left the Commonwealth in 2016 before rejoining in 2020. The country was removed from Schedule 3 in 2017, but legislation was not updated to relist it until 2021. Conversely, although Zimbabwe has not been a part of the Commonwealth since 2003, Zimbabwean citizens retain Commonwealth citizenship because the country remains on Schedule 3.

Most classes of British nationals other than British citizens are also considered Commonwealth citizens. British Overseas Territories citizens, British Overseas citizens, British subjects, and British Nationals (Overseas) all have this additional status. However, British protected persons and non-citizen nationals of other Commonwealth countries (such as Overseas Citizens of India) are not considered Commonwealth citizens.

Acquisition and loss of Commonwealth citizenship is tied to the domestic nationality regulations of each member state; there is no separate process for obtaining this status. It is automatically lost if an individual is no longer a citizen or qualified national of a member state, or if their country is removed from Schedule 3.

Rights and privileges 
Commonwealth citizens have different entitlements in each Commonwealth country, which individually have separate legislation specifying what, if any, rights they are afforded. The organization does not have a permissive system of free movement or labour and in over half of the member states, Commonwealth citizens do not receive substantially different treatment than foreign nationals.

In 16 countries and all three Crown Dependencies of the United Kingdom, Commonwealth citizens may register to vote after fulfilling residence requirements. In Australia, Bermuda, and the Cayman Islands, they no longer have the right to register as electors, but voters who were already registered before that right was ended may continue to participate in elections. Commonwealth citizens are also eligible to serve in one or both houses of the national legislature in Jamaica, Saint Lucia, Saint Vincent and the Grenadines, and the United Kingdom.

All Commonwealth citizens may receive consular assistance from British embassies and consulates in foreign non-Commonwealth nations where their home countries have not established diplomatic or consular posts. They are eligible to apply for British emergency passports, if their travel documents have been lost or stolen and permission has been given by their national governments. Additionally, Australia issues Documents of Identity in exceptional circumstances to resident Commonwealth citizens who are unable to obtain valid travel documents from their countries of origin and must travel urgently.

When residing in the United Kingdom, Commonwealth citizens are generally exempt from registering with local police, may be employed in non-reserved Civil Service posts, and are eligible to enlist in the British Armed Forces.

Right to vote 

The following jurisdictions allow citizens of other Commonwealth countries to vote:

Access to voting in these countries is open to all resident foreign nationals and is not exclusive to Commonwealth citizens:

References

Citations

Sources

Legislation

Publications 

 
 
 
 
 
 
 
 
 
 

British nationality law
Law of the United Kingdom
Transnational citizenship